Tomasz Jasiński may refer to:

 Tomasz Jasiński (historian) (born 1951), Polish historian
 Tomasz Jasiński (ice hockey) (1916–1998), Polish ice hockey player